In enzymology, an O-phosphoserine sulfhydrylase is an enzyme that catalyzes the chemical reaction

O-phospho-L-serine + hydrogen sulfide  L-cysteine + phosphate

Thus, the two substrates of this enzyme are O-phospho-L-serine and hydrogen sulfide, whereas its two products are L-cysteine and phosphate.

This enzyme belongs to the family of transferases, specifically those transferring aryl or alkyl groups other than methyl groups.  The systematic name of this enzyme class is O-phospho-L-serine:hydrogen-sulfide 2-amino-2-carboxyethyltransferase. This enzyme is also called O-phosphoserine(thiol)-lyase.  This enzyme participates in cysteine metabolism and sulfur metabolism.

References

 
 
 

EC 2.5.1
Enzymes of unknown structure